Paul-Marie Coûteaux (born 31 July 1956, in Paris) is a French politician and author. He served as a Member of the European Parliament from 1999 to 2009 for the Movement for France, and since 2022 has been a member of Reconquête.

Early life
Paul-Marie Coûteaux was born on 31 July 1956. He graduated from the École nationale d'administration. In a Gay nightclub, Coûteaux discovered Gaullism.

Family
Descending from Mathieu Coûteaux, bailiff and receiver of Claude Lamoral II, Prince of Ligne House of Ligne and the barony of Belœil, he is the son of writer and scenarist André Couteaux and the brother of Stanislas Coûteaux, founder with Géraldine Becq de Fouquières, of the real estate agency, Book-A-Flat.

Career
Coûteaux was an assistant to Michel Jobert from 1981 to 1983, Philippe de Saint Robert from 1984 to 1987, Jean-Pierre Chevènement from 1988 to 1991, Boutros Boutros-Ghali from 1991 to 1993, Philippe Séguin to the French National Assembly from 1993 to 1996.

Coûteaux served as a Member of the European Parliament (MEP) for Île-de-France from 1999 to 2009. He was a member of the Mouvement pour la France, and a member of the Bureau of the Independence and Democracy. He served on the European Parliament's Committee on Foreign Affairs.

Coûteaux joined Reconquête in 2022.

Works
 Clovis, une histoire de France, Lattès, 1996 
 L'Europe vers la guerre, Michalon, 1997 
 Traité de savoir disparaître à l'usage d'une vieille génération, Michalon, 1998 
 La Puissance et la Honte : trois lettres françaises, Michalon, 1999 
 De Gaulle philosophe : le génie de la France, tome 1, Lattès, 2002 
 Un petit séjour en France, Bartillat, 2003 
 Ne laissons pas mourir la France (avec Nicolas Dupont-Aignan), Albin Michel, 2004 
 Être et parler français, Perrin, 2006 
 De Gaulle philosophe : la colère du peuple, tome 2, Lattès, 2010 
 De Gaulle, espérer contre tout : lettre ouverte à Régis Debray, Xenia, 2010

References

External links
 

1956 births
Living people
École nationale d'administration alumni
French anti-communists
French essayists
French male essayists
MEPs for Île-de-France 2004–2009
Movement for France MEPs
Reconquête politicians
Writers from Paris